Magsaysay, officially the Municipality of Magsaysay (Maranao: Inged a Magsaysay;), is a 5th class municipality in the province of Lanao del Norte, Philippines. According to the 2020 census, it has a population of 20,463 people.

History
Executive Order No. 389, s. 1960 (22 March 1960) created the municipal district of Magsaysay from the following barrios/sitios:

From Kolambugan:

From Tubod
 Baguiguicon

From Tangcal

Originally, Tangcal is part of Municipality of Munai. Some of the barangay in Magsaysay is the same with Tangcal because of the same location. Mayor Macasamat Omar was undefeated Mayor in Magsaysay had also Mayor of municipality of Tangcal. Late Mamalampac Mangansan Mutia of municipality of Tangcal was major rival of Mayor Macasamat Omar in municipality of Tangcal before when Magsaysay in newly establish. The first mayor of the municipality is Mayor Lumantas who was then succeeded by Mayor Guimba Dimakuta. He was then succeeded by Mayor Abdul Rashid M. Dimaporo in an election whose candidacy was challenged by three other candidates namely; Macasamat Omar, Lampa Mutia and Seogal.

Geography

Barangays
Magsaysay is politically subdivided into 24 barangays.

Climate

Demographics

Economy

References

External links
   Magsaysay Profile at the DTI Cities and Municipalities Competitive Index
 [ Philippine Standard Geographic Code]
Philippine Census Information
Local Governance Performance Management System

Municipalities of Lanao del Norte
Establishments by Philippine executive order